Vandalia Township is one of twenty townships in Fayette County, Illinois, USA.  As of the 2010 census, its population was 6,629 and it contained 3,115 housing units.

Geography

Cities, towns, villages
 Vandalia (southeast three-quarters)

Unincorporated towns
 Bluff City

Extinct towns
 Pinhook
 Pope

Cemeteries
The township contains these eight cemeteries: Fairlawn, Haley Chapel, Mother of Dolors, Old State Burial Ground, Pinhook, Ritter, South Hill and Vandalia City.

Major highways
  Interstate 70
  U.S. Route 40
  U.S. Route 51
  Illinois Route 140
  Illinois Route 185

Rivers
 Kaskaskia River

Landmarks
 Kelley Park
 Vandalia Correctional Center (south three-quarters)

Demographics

School districts
 Brownstown Community Unit School District 201
 Vandalia Community Unit School District 203

Political districts
 Illinois' 19th congressional district
 State House District 102
 State Senate District 51

References
 
 United States Census Bureau 2007 TIGER/Line Shapefiles
 United States National Atlas

External links
 City-Data.com
 Illinois State Archives

Townships in Fayette County, Illinois
Populated places established in 1859
Townships in Illinois
1859 establishments in Illinois